Shamshevia is a genus of flies in the family Dolichopodidae from Namibia and India. The genus is named after the Russian dipterist Igor Shamshev.

Species
 Shamshevia hoanibensis Grichanov, 2012
 Shamshevia reshchikovi Grichanov, 2012

References

Dolichopodidae genera
Diaphorinae
Diptera of Africa
Diptera of Asia